Dragan Blatnjak (born 1 August 1981) is a Bosnian-Herzegovinian football manager and former player. He is an assistant coach for Croatian club Zadar.

Club career
Previously he played for FC Khimki (until 2010) and Hajduk Split in the Croatian First League.

International career
He made his debut for Bosnia and Herzegovina in a March 2002 friendly match away against Macedonia and has earned a total of 12 caps, scoring no goals. His final international was an October 2007 European Championship qualification match against Norway.

References

External links
 
 

1981 births
Living people
People from Teslić
Croats of Bosnia and Herzegovina
Association football midfielders
Bosnia and Herzegovina footballers
Bosnia and Herzegovina international footballers
NK Brotnjo players
NK Zadar players
HNK Hajduk Split players
FC Khimki players
FC Rostov players
NK Osijek players
Premier League of Bosnia and Herzegovina players
Croatian Football League players
Russian Premier League players
Bosnia and Herzegovina expatriate footballers
Expatriate footballers in Croatia
Bosnia and Herzegovina expatriate sportspeople in Croatia
Expatriate footballers in Russia
Bosnia and Herzegovina expatriate sportspeople in Russia
Bosnia and Herzegovina football managers
NK Zadar managers
Bosnia and Herzegovina expatriate football managers
Expatriate football managers in Croatia